Maavarulu Airport  is a domestic airport located on Maavarulu, one of the islands of the Gaafu Dhaalu Atoll in Maldives. Scheduled Flights started on 4th July 2020.

Facilities

Airlines and destinations

See also
List of airports in the Maldives
List of airlines of the Maldives

References

Airports in the Maldives
Airports established in 2019